John Michael Adrenne Cunningham (25 April 1912 – 29 July 1996) was an Australian politician who was a Liberal Party member of the Legislative Council of Western Australia from 1948 to 1954 and again from 1955 to 1962. He also served as mayor of Boulder from 1954 to 1955.

Early life
Cunningham was born in Boulder, Western Australia, to Alice Frances (née Oaklands) and John Edmond Cunningham. His father died when he was eight, and he moved to Perth to live with his grandmother. After leaving school, Cunningham worked a number of odd jobs, spending periods as a printer's devil, delivery boy, prospector, and miner (at Meekatharra). He eventually became a certified boiler attendant and engine driver, and worked on the railway at Mount Isa, Queensland. Cunningham enlisted in the Royal Australian Air Force (RAAF) in September 1942, and served in the South-West Pacific theatre (including in New Guinea) as a radar operator and hygiene officer.

Politics
Cunningham returned to Boulder after his military service, and in 1947 was elected to the Boulder Municipal Council. He served on the council until 1955, including as mayor from 1954 to 1955. Cunningham entered parliament at the 1948 Legislative Council elections, standing in South Province. After a reconstitution, he was appointed to South-East Province in 1950, but was defeated by Labor's Jim Garrigan in 1954. Cunningham re-entered the Legislative Council just over a year later, at a by-election following the death of Robert Boylen. He was re-elected in 1956, but in 1962 lost his seat to Labor's Claude Stubbs. He made an unsuccessful attempt to reclaim his seat at the 1965 state election.

Later life
After leaving parliament, Cunningham bought a news agency in Boulder. He sold that in 1965, and then worked for periods for Western Mining and Hendry, Rae and Court (an accounting firm). Cunningham died in Perth<https://www.parliament.wa.gov.au/parliament/library/MPHistoricalData.nsf/(Lookup)/69FBE8E2BA4BFD1D482577E50028A59C?OpenDocument#current></ref> in July 1996, aged 84. He had married Elva May Alcock in 1939, with whom he had two children, but was widowed in 1987.

References

1912 births
1996 deaths
Liberal Party of Australia members of the Parliament of Western Australia
Mayors of places in Western Australia
Members of the Western Australian Legislative Council
People from Boulder, Western Australia
Royal Australian Air Force personnel of World War II
Western Australian local councillors